The Amerton Railway is a  narrow gauge heritage railway in the English county of Staffordshire. It is owned by Staffordshire Narrow Gauge Railway Limited, a registered charity, and operated by volunteers.

Construction of the railway started in 1990 in a field at the side of Amerton Working Farm. The first trains ran in 1992, but it was around 10 years later when the railway was completed as a full circle with two passing Loops. The collection of locomotives is primarily focused around locomotives that were either built or operated in Staffordshire.

Development of the line 
There is the main 3 road running shed housing majority of the locomotives, operational and stored, a large workshop next door where restoration and maintenance take place, then a small covered siding is located between the workshop and carriage shed.

On 10 August 2001 the railway was very fortunate to acquire the Leek and Manifold Valley Light Railway/North Staffordshire Railway (The Knotty)/LMS Signal Box from Waterhouses Station. This controlled both the narrow gauge and standard gauge lines at Waterhouses. It is passed at the end of the platform and has undergone major restoration, and is now in its final stages with lever frame installed and painting on final gloss coats (Jan 2017), proved to be very popular at the 2016 steam gala when the public where allowed inside.

A comprehensive industrial demonstration railway is now being developed from the old phase 1 stump siding area to add a turning triangle and a large amount of outdoor storage space.

A demonstration mine and blacksmith workshop has also been constructed along with a few mine wagons to resemble an old gypsum mine that used to operate not far from where the railway is today

Rolling stock
Restoration is in progress on a number of narrow gauge wagons. The railway owns nine RNAD wagons. A set of three RNAD box vans and six RNAD flat wagons, or "flats". The vans and three flats have been converted from 2 ft 6 in track gauge and to run on the line, with one van three flats been fully restored, one of these flats has been rebuilt into a ballast wagon ("Minnow") the later three flats had recently arrived from Chasewater Railway. The wheelsets and frames are currently separated, with the 2 ft 6 in wheelsets currently in Amerton Yard, and the frames up at "stump siding". These are to be fully restored when time and finances allow.  Three ex- RAF Fauld drop-side wagons have been restored and painted in RAF colours during 2016, as well as two ex-MOD flats, one rebuilt to a short sided wagon, the other to the original MOD high end sided flats. There are  Allen skips on the railway. They have recently been taken off from mainline running, due to skips buckets deterioration, and the wheelset for  gauge, meaning they would derail at times. Plans are being made to regauge and replace the wheelsets to running order.

Locomotives

See also 
British narrow gauge railways

References

Further reading

External links 

 

Heritage railways in Staffordshire
2 ft gauge railways in England